This is a list of notable events in country music that took place in the year 1950.

Events 
 February 14 — "Chattanoogie Shoe Shine Boy" by Red Foley #1 selling Country record becomes first Country cross over on Pop Best Seller chart. 
 August 19 — Hank Snow begins a 21-week run at No. 1  on the Billboard country charts with his landmark "I'm Movin' On." Until 2013 (when changes to chart methodology will result in longer chart runs), the song – a 12-bar blues song metaphorically using a train trip to describe a young man's breakup with a high-class girlfriend – is one of just three that will stay as long atop the charts in chart history.
 September 30 — The Grand Ole Opry is televised for the first time.

Top hits of the year

Number one hits
(As certified by Billboard magazine)

Note: Several songs were simultaneous No. 1 hits on the separate "Most Played Juke Box Folk (Country & Western) Records," "Best Selling Retail Folk (Country & Western) Records" and "Country & Western Records Most Played by Folk Disk Jockeys" charts.

Other major hits

Births 
 January 1 – Steve Ripley, leader/producer of The Tractors (died 2019).
 February 16 — Paul Worley, record producer whose success dates from the mid-1980s onward.
 March 26 — Ronnie McDowell, male vocalist of the 1970s and 1980s, who first rose to fame with his Elvis Presley tribute "The King Is Gone".
 August 7 — Rodney Crowell, singer-songwriter who enjoyed mainstream fame in the late 1980s before becoming a leader in the alternative country movement; ex-husband of Rosanne Cash.
 September 16 — David Bellamy, of The Bellamy Brothers.

Deaths

Further reading 
 Kingsbury, Paul, "Vinyl Hayride: Country Music Album Covers 1947–1989," Country Music Foundation, 2003
 Millard, Bob, "Country Music: 70 Years of America's Favorite Music," HarperCollins, New York, 1993
 Whitburn, Joel. "Top Country Songs 1944–2005 – 6th Edition." 2005.

References

Country
Country music by year